The Bedford OY is an army lorry (truck) built by Bedford for the British Armed Forces and introduced in 1939. It was based on Bedford's O-series commercial vehicles with a modified front end and single rear tyres. It was designed for a 3-ton payload. The OYD was a general service vehicle, while the OYC was a tanker version for carrying water or petrol. These vehicles were widely used during, and after, World War II but were later superseded by the Bedford RL.

Technical data
 Engine: Bedford 6-cylinder, type WD, 3,519 cc (214 cubic inches) displacement, liquid cooled
 Horsepower: 72 at 3,000 rpm
 Transmission: 4-speed manual
 Transfer box: None
 Electrical system: 12 volt
 Brakes: Hydraulic with vacuum servo assistance
 Tyres: 10.50 - 16
 Fuel type: Petrol
 Fuel capacity: 145 litres (32 gallons)
 Range: 450 km (280 miles)
 Maximum speed: about 65 km/h (40 mph)

Variants
OYD - general service 
OYC - tanker

Derived non-military vehicles using OY and OX chassis
OWS - 5-ton short wheelbase
OWB  - 32 seat bus

Bedford OX

The OX was a short-wheelbase version of the OY, designed for a 30 cwt (1.5 ton) payload. It had a semi-forward cab that resembled the 15-cwt Bedford MW.

In the early part of the war, the addition of an armoured body to the OXD gave the Bedford OXA (official designation "Lorry 30cwt Anti-Tank"). These were used for home defence.

Notes

References

External links 
Bedford OYC walkaround

OY
World War II vehicles of the United Kingdom
Military trucks of the United Kingdom
Military vehicles introduced in the 1930s